Athletics competitions at the 1998 Micronesian Games were held at the National Stadium (Palau) in Koror, Palau, between August 1–8, 1998.

A total of 32 events were contested, 16 by men and 16 by women.

Medal summary
Medal winners and their results were published on the Athletics Weekly webpage
courtesy of Tony Isaacs.  Complete results can be found in the Pacific Islands Athletics Statistics.

Men

Women

Medal table
The medal table was published.

References

Athletics at the Micronesian Games
Athletics in Palau
Micronesian Games
Micro
International sports competitions hosted by Palau